Dahlvig is a surname. Notable people with the surname include:

Anders Dahlvig (born 1957), Swedish businessman
Sven Dahlvig, Swedish philatelist

Swedish-language surnames